The Chinese Ambassador to Portugal is the official representative of the People's Republic of China to the Portuguese Republic.

List of representatives

See also
China–Portugal relations

References 

 
China
Portugal